Kunisaki Peninsula is a peninsula in Oita prefecture that juts out into the Seto Inland Sea. The peninsula is almost circular.

Municipalities in the peninsula 

 Bungotakada
 Kunisaki
 Kitsuki
 Hayami District
 Hiji

References 

Peninsulas of Japan
Landforms of Ōita Prefecture